Bartlow railway station was a station in Bartlow, Cambridgeshire on the Stour Valley Railway at the junction with the Saffron Walden Railway. There were two platforms on the Stour Valley line and a separate linked platform for the line to Saffron Walden.

History
The station was originally constructed by the Great Eastern Railway in 1865. The Saffron Walden line closed in 1964 and the station was closed with the Stour Valley Line in 1967 in the wake of the Beeching Axe as a large number of Britain's railway stations were shut. The station buildings have since been converted to a house.

References

External links 
 More photos of the station

Disused railway stations in Cambridgeshire
Former Great Eastern Railway stations
Railway stations in Great Britain opened in 1865
Railway stations in Great Britain closed in 1967
Beeching closures in England